Wangchun Bridge Station is a station on Line 1 of the Ningbo Rail Transit that started operations on 30May 2014. It is situated under Wangchun Road in Haishu District of Ningbo City, Zhejiang Province, eastern China.

Exits

References

Railway stations in Zhejiang
Railway stations in China opened in 2014
Ningbo Rail Transit stations